Oyam may refer to:

Oyam, Gabon
Oyam, Panchthar, a Village Development Committee in Nepal
Oyam District, a district in northern Uganda
Oyam, Uganda, the 'chief town' and administrative headquarters of Oyam District